Archirhodomyrtus is a genus of flowering plants in the myrtle family, Myrtaceae, describe as a genus in 1941. There are five known species, four native to New Caledonia and one native to Australia.

These are trees and shrubs with oppositely arranged leaves and flowers in the leaf axils. Flowers are solitary, paired, or in threes. There are 5 sepals, 5 petals, and many stamens. The fruit is a smooth berry with many seeds.

Species

 Archirhodomyrtus baladensis – New Caledonia
 Archirhodomyrtus beckleri – rose myrtle – Queensland, New South Wales
 Archirhodomyrtus paitensis – New Caledonia
 Archirhodomyrtus turbinata – New Caledonia
 Archirhodomyrtus vieillardi – New Caledonia

References

Myrtaceae genera
Myrtaceae